Jeannou is a 1943 French comedy film directed by Léon Poirier and starring Michèle Alfa, Saturnin Fabre and Thomy Bourdelle.

The film's sets were designed by the art director Raymond Druart. It was partly shot on location in Mouzens in the Dordogne region.

The film was made during the German occupation of France and is notable for its Vichyist theme of returning to the land. Poirier had already displayed his Nationalist sympathies with his patriotic films Verdun and The Call of Silence.

Cast 
 Michèle Alfa as Jeannou  
 Saturnin Fabre as Frochard  
 Thomy Bourdelle as Peyrac  
 Roger Duchesne as Pierre Levasseur  
 Pierre Magnier as Le marquis de Cantagril  
 Maurice Schutz as Éloi des Farges  
 Henri Poupon 
 Henri Arius 
 Pierre Labry 
 Maurice Salabert 
 Lyne Carrel as Albertine  
 Marcelle Géniat as Marceline  
 Mireille Perrey as Conchita de Cantagril

References

Bibliography 
 Crisp, Colin. French Cinema—A Critical Filmography: Volume 2, 1940–1958. Indiana University Press, 2015.

External links 
 

1943 films
French comedy films
1943 comedy films
1940s French-language films
Films directed by Léon Poirier
Gaumont Film Company films
French black-and-white films
1940s French films